Raymond Lincoln Kennedy (May 19, 1895 – January 18, 1969) was an American professional baseball player, scout and front office executive. He was born in Pittsburgh, Pennsylvania.

Playing career: One MLB at-bat

Kennedy's professional playing career came almost exclusively at the minor league level. A catcher and second baseman, he played from 1915 to 1917 and in 1919–27, largely in the original Sally League.  He made one appearance as a player in Major League Baseball as a  pinch hitter for the   St. Louis Browns on September 8, and went hitless in his only at bat against the Detroit Tigers.  He had spent most of that season in the Class D Illinois State League.

Executive career: First GM of Pirates (1946)
Kennedy was the first person to hold the title of general manager in the history of the Pittsburgh Pirates, spending one season, in the post. He had been hired from the New York Yankees organization, where he had previously been secretary and business manager of the Newark Bears, one of the Bombers' two top-level farm clubs. However, the Bucs were in the process of being sold after 46 years of ownership by the Barney Dreyfuss family.  On August 8, 1946, the team was purchased by a consortium led by Indianapolis businessman Frank McKinney, Columbus, Ohio-based real estate developer John W. Galbreath, Pittsburgh attorney Thomas P. Johnson, and entertainer Bing Crosby.

The Pirates' new owners brought in their own general manager at the end of the season: Roy Hamey, who had been president of the Triple-A American Association. Ironically, Hamey had previously been Kennedy's peer as the business manager of the Yankees' other top farm team, the Kansas City Blues. In the front-office transition that followed, Kennedy remained with the Pirates as director of minor league clubs from 1947 to 1948.  In 1949, Kennedy became minor league director of the Detroit Tigers, serving through 1951. In 1955, Kennedy was player personnel director of the Kansas City Athletics and was working as a scout for the New York Mets at the time of his death, at age 73, in Casselberry, Florida.

References

External links
Baseball Reference.com

See also

1895 births
1969 deaths
Asheville Tourists managers
Baseball players from Pittsburgh
Charlotte Hornets (baseball) players
Greenville Spinners players
Kansas City Athletics executives
Little Rock Travelers players
Major League Baseball farm directors
Major League Baseball general managers
New York Mets scouts
Olean White Sox players
People from Casselberry, Florida
Pittsburgh Pirates executives
Reading Aces players
St. Louis Browns players
Sportspeople from Pittsburgh
Wellsville Rainmakers players